The York Chocolate (or simply York) was an uncommon American breed of show cat, with a long, fluffy coat and a tapered tail and most of them were mostly or entirely chocolate-brown or the dilute form of brown, known as lavender. The breed was named after New York state, where it was established in 1983. This breed was created by color-selecting domestic long-haired cats of mixed ancestry.  The breed was not widely recognized by cat registries. It was not recognized by the major organizations such as The International Cat Association (TICA), the Cat Fanciers' Association (CFA – North America) or Fédération Internationale Féline (FIFe - Europe).  By 2015 there was only one listed breeder of York Chocolates (Debbie Reber). By 2016, no registry carried its breed standard, there were no breeder websites and the breed is considered extinct. Although similar looking random-bred cats can be found today, without pedigree papers these are not York Chocolate cats.

As “Il Gatto Cioccolato” it found favour in Italy and the International York Chocolate Federation (IYCF) was founded there in 2003. The site can now only be found on the Internet Archive, having become dormant since. The IYCF claimed affiliation with the German Feline Federation Europe (FFE)/Bavarian Cat Fanciers' Association (BCFA), which published a standard (minus colour information) in 2004. It also claimed affiliation with the Russian World Felinological Federation (WFF), although the latter does not recognize the York Chocolate as breed.

History
The breed was created by Janet Chiefari in 1983. The father was a black longhaired cat and the mother was a longhaired black and white cat. Their Siamese ancestors created the brown coloring in one kitten: Brownie. Brownie had a litter that subsequent summer with a black longhaired tom. There were two kittens in the litter: a chocolate male and a white and chocolate female. Upon noticing similarities in coat and body types, Chiefari began her own breeding program.

The breed is recognized, under the shorter name York, by the recently founded World Cat Federation based in Germany, and with some differences from previously published standards, most of which seem to be lost.  The breed is not recognized by any major, long-established international cat fancier organizations, such as The International Cat Association (TICA), the Cat Fanciers' Association (CFA) or Fédération Internationale Féline (FIFe), nor even US national groups such as the American Cat Fanciers Association (ACFA).  In March 1990, the Cat Fanciers' Federation of the New England area of the US recognized York Chocolates as an "experimental" cat breed, and allegedly gave it championship status within the group in March 1992, but publishes no breed standard or any other information about the breed today. It was supposedly granted champion status by the Canadian Cat Association in March 1995, as well, but while the CCA published a breed standard in 1995, the organization no longer advertises it, and it includes outdated wording.

A small breed club, the International York Chocolate Federation (IYCF) was founded in Italy, but seems to have been dormant since 2004. It claims affiliation with Feline Federation Europe (FFE), which since 2004 publishes a York Chocolate standard (missing the color information) and the World Felinological Federation (WFF), a Russian group, which does not recognize this breed.

Temperament
The York Chocolate was a very friendly, even-tempered breed that was very content as a lap cat.  They loved to be held and cuddled.  The cats were described as intelligent, energetic, and curious, happily following their owner around. They were good companions and good hunters. They are sometimes shy.

References

External links
YorkChocolate.org, a website devoted to the breed
York Chocolate with early pedigree and history.

Cat breeds
Cat breeds originating in the United States